Goniobranchus albopunctatus is a species of colourful sea slug, a dorid nudibranch, a marine gastropod mollusc in the family Chromodorididae.

Distribution
This marine species was described from Huahine, Society Islands, Pacific Ocean. It has been reported from Sulawesi and on the East African coast from Tanzania to South Africa and from the Marshall Islands.

References

External links
 

Chromodorididae
Gastropods described in 1879